James Russell Watt (29 December 1935 – 25 June 2022) was a New Zealand rugby union player. He played 42 matches for the All Blacks including nine internationals, scoring 114 points in all.

On 30 April 1960, Watt became engaged to Betty Thorner, and the couple later married.

Watt died on 25 June 2022 in Silverstream, at the age of 86.

References

1935 births
2022 deaths
Rugby union players from Dunedin
People educated at Otago Boys' High School
New Zealand rugby union players
New Zealand international rugby union players
Otago rugby union players
Southland rugby union players
Wellington rugby union players
Rugby union wings